Lesia is a genus of flowering plants in the family Gesneriaceae, subfamily Gesnerioideae.

Species
, Plants of the World Online accepted two species:
Lesia savannarum (C.V.Morton) J.L.Clark & J.F.Sm.
Lesia tepuiensis G.E.Ferreira & Chautems

References

Gesnerioideae
Gesneriaceae genera